Swing con Son is a 1996 album by Venezuelan musician Alberto Naranjo.

Track listing

Alberto Naranjo & Latin Jazz Big Band personnel
Alberto Naranjo – leader, arrangements, drums, timbales
Alberto Lazo – acoustic piano
Jorge Del Pino – acoustic bass
Julio Flores – soprano and alto saxophones; flute
Evencio Villamizar – alto saxophone, flute
Hernando Bonilla – tenor saxophone, flute
Bautista Chacón – tenor saxophone, clarinet
Horacio Mogollón – baritone saxophone, clarinet
José Rodríguez, Agustin Valdés, Nelson Contreras, Figueredo Zerpa – trumpets, flugelhorns
Domingo Pagliuca, Alberto Benedetti – tenor trombones
Oscar Mendoza, Antonio Ponte – bass trombones
Vladimir Quintero – congas
Enrique Mata – bongos, Dominican tambora
José Hernández – maracas, güiro

Lead vocals
Carlos Espósito (tracks 3, 5, 7, 10, 11)
Arturo Guaramato (tracks 6, 7, 11)
Juan José Capella (tracks 7, 12)

Special guests
Billo's Happy Boys Orchestra (track 1)
Billo's Caracas Boys (track 13)
María Rivas – lead vocal (track 4)
Rafa Galindo, Manolo Monterrey – lead vocals (track 14)
Nancy Toro – lead vocal (track 12)
Fusión IV + 2 – vocal group (track 8)
Rafael Velásquez – trumpet / flugel horn solos (tracks 3, 4 / 6)
Frank Hernández, Yorman Méndez – timbal solos (track  7)
Gustavo Carucí – acoustic guitar (track 14)
Annette León – harp (track 12)
Joao Aponte, Luis Serrano – chorus (tracks 2, 3, 4, 5, 6, 7, 9, 10, 11)
Adela Blanco, Elisa Vegas, Eugenia Vegas – kids chorus (track 10)

Other credits
 Recorded and mixed by Agustín [Augie] Verde at Estudios Intersonido in Caracas, Venezuela
 Date of recording: March through May 1996
 Musical producer: Alberto Naranjo
 Executive producers: Roberto Obeso and Federico Pacanins
 Graphic design/Illustrations: Adriana Reina
 Photographers: Alejandro Toro, Angel de la Osa

External links
Salsa 2-U.com
Sincopa.com

1996 albums
Alberto Naranjo albums